Soetjipto Soentoro (16 June 1941 – 12 November 1994), commonly known as "Gareng", was an Indonesian footballer who captained Indonesia's national team.

Biography
Born in Bandung, Jawa Barat, he was raised in a family of football enthusiasts - his brothers were Soegijo and Soegito, who played for Persija Jakarta between 1952 and 1964. Soetjipto played football as a teenager in the streets in the area of Kebayoran Baru, Jakarta in 1954. He came to the attention of Djamiat Dalhar when playing for Setia Jakarta (a Persija youth team) who subsequently called Soetjipto up to the national junior team.

At 16 years old, Soentoro joined Persija where he was given his nickname "Gareng", after a diminutive character in Indonesia's Wayang, due his short stature.

Club career

In his debut, Soentoro scored four goals in a 7–0 against PSP Padang. He followed up that performance with a goal against PSB Bogor and an equalizer against PSM Makassar. With four more goals against PSMS and a hat trick against Persib, Soentoro helped Persija reach the final which they won against Persebaya to become the 1964 Perserikatan champions. After an unbeaten season, Soentoro was confirmed as the top scorer having scored 16 goals in his debut season.

During the newly formatted 1964-65 Perserikatan, Persija failed to defend their title, losing in the semi-final despite Soentoro scoring in their first leg victory over Persebaya. They would go on to lose the second leg 4-2 and be eliminated as a result.

In the 1965-66 Perserikatan, Persija finished forth in the West Zone with Soetjipto scoring three times in his five appearances.

Persija fared better in the 1966-67 Perserikatan, finishing third in the Western Group with Soetjipto scoring five goals in his five appearances.

In the 1969-71 Perserikatan, Soetjipto scored two goals in his three appearances.

National team career

Junior team 

In the 1960 AFC Youth Championship, Soetjipto Soentoro scored five goals to lead Indonesia to a third place finish, scoring his first against Singapore in the first minute. His performance at the tournament led him to receive his first senior call-up.

Senior team
In 1965, Indonesia travelled to Europe to play two powerhouses of European football, Feyenoord, of the Netherlands and SV Werder Bremen, of Germany.

Despite Sukarno's words of motivation prior to their game against the Eredivisie champions Feyenoord, featuring Guus Hiddink, Indonesia lost 6–1 with Soentoro scoring in the second minute. He would follow this performance with a hat trick against Bundesliga champions Werder Bremen Bremen manager, Günter Brocker, offered Soentoro a chance to play for Werder Bremen but this was not sanctioned by Sukarno, especially as the squad was preparing for the 1966 Asian Games.

Soetjipto made his debut in international competitions at the 1966 Asian Games in Tokyo, scoring two goals as Indonesia reached the quarter-finals and followed that up at the 1966 Aga Khan Gold Cup with nine goals in four games including a goal in the final against Mohammedan SC, which Indonesia won 2–1.

Soetjipto scored nine goals at the 1968 Merdeka Tournament and helped Indonesia win the 1968 King's Cup with seven goals in five games followed by victory in the 1969 Merdeka Tournament with another eleven goals from Soetjipto.

At the 1970 Asian Games, Soetjipto only managed one goal in their match against Iran. Following the tournament he announced his retirement.

Managerial career 
Initially Soetjipto joined Bank Negara Indonesia before choosing to study coaching in West Germany in 1978 and eventually coaching Buana Putra, Persiba Balikpapan and Persiraja Banda Aceh.

Soetjipto also managed the Indonesia Under-19s during the 1978 AFC Youth Championship and 1979 FIFA World Youth Championship. However his Indonesian side were unable to progress beyond the group stage after losing each of their games by five or more goals.

Death 
In 1990, Soetjipto suffered from liver cancer, after four years fighting against the illness, he died on 12 November 1994. He was 53 years old. He left two children, Bisma and Tantri.

Career statistics

Club

International

International goals 

Scores and results list Indonesia's goal tally first, score column indicates score after each Indonesia goal.

Honours
Persija Jakarta
 Perserikatan: 1964

Indonesia
 Merdeka Tournament: 1969
 King's Cup: 1968

Individual
 Merdeka Tournament Top Scorer: 1969
 King's Cup Top Scorer: 1968
 Galatama Top Scorer: 1964
AFC Asian All Stars: 1967, 1968 
 IFFHS Men’s All Time Indonesia Dream Team: 2022'''

References 

1941 births
1994 deaths
Indonesian footballers
Indonesia international footballers
PSMS Medan players
Footballers at the 1966 Asian Games
Footballers at the 1970 Asian Games
Association football forwards
Asian Games competitors for Indonesia
Sportspeople from Bandung